Montevideo is the capital city of Uruguay.

It may also refer to:
Montevideo Department, Uruguay
Montevideo District, Peru
Montevideo, Georgia, a community in the United States
Montevideo, Minnesota, a city in the United States
Montevideo skyscraper, in Rotterdam, Netherlands
Montevideo Maru, a Japanese auxiliary vessel sunk in the Second World War
Montevideo units, a means of assessing contractions during labor
Montevideo Convention, an international treaty which sets out the nature, rights and duties of statehood
Rue de Montevideo, a street in the 16th arrondissement of Paris
Montevideo, God Bless You! (Montevideo, Bog te video), a Serbian film
Monte Video and the Cassettes, a New Zealand novelty band from the 1980s.
 Montevideo (horse)
, a Hammonia-class ocean liner
Montevideo (Mexico City Metrobús, Line 3), a BRT station in Mexico City
Montevideo (Mexico City Metrobús, Line 6), a BRT station in Mexico City